Tyrone Ferm is a Swedish sprint canoer who competed in the mid-1960s. He won a silver medal in the K-2 10000 m event at the 1963 ICF Canoe Sprint World Championships in Jajce.

References

Living people
Swedish male canoeists
Year of birth missing (living people)
ICF Canoe Sprint World Championships medalists in kayak